Katafygio is a village and a community in the  regional unit of Kozani, northern Greece. It is part of the municipality of Velventos. The 2011 census recorded 28 inhabitants in the village.

References

Populated places in Kozani (regional unit)